The Journal for Early Modern Cultural Studies is a quarterly peer-reviewed academic journal and the official publication of the Group for Early Modern Cultural Studies. It covers the cultural history of the period from the late fifteenth to the late nineteenth centuries. The journal was established in 2001 and has been published by the University of Pennsylvania Press since 2011. The journal was published biannually until 2012, when it became a quarterly publication. The editor-in-chief is Daniel Vitkus.

Abstracting and indexing 
The journal is abstracted and indexed in the MLA International Bibliography.

References

External links 

 

Cultural journals
Publications established in 2001
Quarterly journals
University of Pennsylvania Press academic journals